Forest City Baptist Church, also known as First Baptist Church, is a historic Baptist church building located at 301 W. Main Street in Forest City, Rutherford County, North Carolina.  It was designed by architect James M. McMichael and built in 1915.  It is a two-story, cruciform plan, Classical Revival style brick building.  It consists of an octagonal core surmounted by an eight-sided, slate-covered, pyramidal roof from which rectangular pedimented-gable wings project on the four sides.  Adjoining the church is the Alexander Memorial building, built in 1927.

It was added to the National Register of Historic Places in 1989.

References

Baptist churches in North Carolina
Churches on the National Register of Historic Places in North Carolina
Forest City, North Carolina
Neoclassical architecture in North Carolina
Churches completed in 1915
20th-century Baptist churches in the United States
Churches in Rutherford County, North Carolina
National Register of Historic Places in Rutherford County, North Carolina
1915 establishments in North Carolina
Neoclassical church buildings in the United States